The Committee for Justice is a Northern Ireland Assembly committee established to advise, assist and scrutinise the work of the Department of Justice. The Committee undertakes a scrutiny, policy development and consultation role with respect to the Department of Justice and plays a key role in the consideration and development of legislation.

The committee was created following the devolution of policing and justice on 12 April 2010, as a result of the Hillsborough Castle Agreement, agreed under the premiership of Gordon Brown on 5 February 2010.

Membership (9)

See also 
 Committee

References

External links 
 Committee for Justice at niassembly.gov.uk

Northern Ireland Assembly
Committees